EBM is the seventh studio album from British band Editors. It was released on 23 September 2022 by PIAS Recordings. The album is named after both the band and their newest member ("Editors/Blanck Mass") and the genre electronic body music.

Style and composition 
EBM has been described by critics as pop, indietronica, new wave, industrial rock and EDM.

Track listing

Charts

References

2022 albums
Editors (band) albums
PIAS Recordings albums